The Erysipelotrichaceae are a family of Gram-positive bacteria.

Phylogeny
The currently accepted taxonomy is based on the List of Prokaryotic names with Standing in Nomenclature (LPSN) and National Center for Biotechnology Information (NCBI)

See also
 List of bacteria genera
 List of bacterial orders

References

Erysipelotrichia
Bacteria families